Prayar Prabhakaran is a literary critic, academic and orator from Kerala, India. He won several noted awards including Kerala Sahitya Akademi Award for Overall Contributions and the Thayatt Award for Literary Criticism.

Biography
Prabhakaran was born on August 14, 1930, at Prayar near Oachira in present-day Kollam district, to Lakshmikutty Amma and Swami Brahmavrathanan an orator, scholar and writer. After passing B.Ed. from the Training College, Thiruvananthapuram, from 1950 to 1963 he worked as Malayalam teacher at Sooranad Government High School, and later joined the University College Thiruvananthapuram for his MA. Soon after completing MA in 1964, he became a lecturer at S. N. Women's College, Kollam, and became a teacher in various colleges under the SN Trust. He retired from S. N. College, Kollam on March 31, 1986, and after retirement he became a teacher at Alappuzha B.Ed. Center.

He had a penchant for communist ideology from a young age. With A. G. P. Namboothiri and Devikulangara A. Bharathan, he formed the Puthuppally Prayar Party Cell. While a member of the CPI (M) Chunakkara local committee, he took part in an agitation and was imprisoned for four days.

Prayar has done many studies in Indian literature. His first work Bharatheeya Saahithya Saastra Padanangal is a study of Indian literature. He entered the field of critical writing by writing a critical study of Joseph Mundassery's book Natakantham Kavitvam. Communist leader and first chief minister of Kerala, E. M. S. Namboodiripad notes that Prayar's works should be read by both those who agree and those who oppose the Marxian literary approach.

Prabhakaran held several positions including member of the Board of Studies M.A. (Malayalam) of the University of Kerala, member of the Board of Examinations, member of the Faculty of Oriental Studies, member of the Kerala Sahitya Akademi, member of the Kerala Lalithakala Akademi, member of the Senate of the University of Cochin and member of the Thunchan Memorial Governing Council. He was a member of the State Committee of the Purogamana Kala Sahitya Sangham.

Personal life
His wife L. Vasundhathi is retired headmistress of Mavelikkara Govt Girls High School and former Chunakkara panchayat president. Vasundhati is the daughter of K. K. Panicker, his teacher in his Sahithya visharad studies. Couple have 3 children. They lives in their house at Chunakkara, Alappuzha district. The family settled in Chunakkara after his wife was transferred to Chunakkara Government High School.

Selected works
Kavi Bharatheeya Sahithya Charitrathil
Asan Kavithayude hrudaya thalam, study on works of Kumaran Asan
Anubhoothiyude Anupallavi
Narayana Guru Abheda Darsanathinte Deeptha Saundaryam, study on works of Narayana Guru
Bharatheeya Saahithya Saastra Padanangal
Prathibhayude Prakasa Gopurangal
Vedangal Athmavidyayude Adimarekha, study on Vedas
Bharatha Muniyute Natya Sastratthiloode, study on Bharata Muni's Natyasastra
Saundaryabodhathil Oru Kannikkoythu

Awards and honors
Kerala Sahitya Akademi Award for Overall Contributions
Thayatt Award (1998)
K Prasannan Sahithya puraskaram
Abudhabi Sakthi Award
Veenapoovu Satabdi Samman
Thiruvananthapuram Gurudevan Book Trust Award
Dr. Sukumar Azhikkodu Vicharavedi Award

References

1930 births
Malayalam-language writers
Indian literary critics
Living people
People from Kollam district
Recipients of the Kerala Sahitya Akademi Award